Hermosa is a genus of jumping spiders first described by G. W. Peckham and E. G. Peckham in 1892, and synonymized with Myrmarachne in 1901. In 2016, Jerzy Prószyński split up Myrmarachne, creating nine new genera, all with names beginning "Myrm". However, it turned out that Myrmavola volatilis, the type species of Myrmavola, was also the type species of Hermosa, and Myrmavola was made a junior synonym. It is part of the Myrmarachnini tribe within the Salticoida clade of Salticinae.

Species
 it contains seven species:
H. andrewi (Wanless, 1978) – Congo, Angola
H. brevichelicera (Yamasaki & Ahmad, 2013) – Malaysia (Borneo)
H. christae (Prószyński, 2001) – Malaysia (Borneo)
H. galianoae (Prószyński, 2001) – Malaysia (Borneo)
H. volatilis G. W. Peckham & E. G. Peckham, 1892 (type) – Madagascar, China, Vietnam
H. yamanei (Yamasaki, 2012) – Indonesia (Sulawesi)
H. yamasakii (Prószyński, 2016) – Malaysia (Borneo)

See also
 Myrmarachne
 Damoetas
 List of Salticidae genera

References

Further reading

Salticidae genera